According to Ukrainian government officials and news sources, President of Ukraine Volodymyr Zelenskyy has survived a number of assassination and kidnapping attempts by Russian or pro-Russian agents during the 2022 Russian invasion of Ukraine.

Background 
In order to quickly end the 2022 Russian invasion of Ukraine, Russia planned to have groups enter Kyiv, the capital of Ukraine, and destroy Ukraine's leadership. Presidential advisor Mykhailo Podolyak stated that "Russia's key intention [was] to remove the country's top leadership, create maximum panic, and try to establish its own puppet government".

Attempts 
According to the Ukrainian government, in early February 2022, Russian president Vladimir Putin instructed Chechen leader Ramzan Kadyrov to eliminate Ukrainian leaders. In early March, Ukraine intelligence said that Chechen commandos sent to assassinate Zelenskyy had been "eliminated", with help from FSB agents sympathetic to Ukraine.

More than 400 Russian mercenaries from the Wagner Group were reported to have been in Kyiv by late February 2022, with orders to assassinate  Zelenskyy and destabilize the government enough for Russia to take control.

Number of attempts 
During the conflict there were conflicting accounts of the number of assassination attempts made against Zelenskyy. Presidential advisor Podoliyak referenced the issue while speaking to the Ukrainian Pravda news outlet, saying, "Our foreign partners are talking about two or three attempts. I believe that there were more than a dozen attempts".

In addition, on Saturday, 26 February 2022, an assassination attempt by a group of Chechen mercenaries was prevented on the outskirts of Kyiv with the would be assassins killed.

In early March 2022, the head of Ukraine's National Security Council, Oleksiy Danilov, said that Zelenskyy had survived three assassination attempts in one week. Danilov credited the aid of anti-war intelligence officers within Russia's Federal Security Service (FSB) who shared information with Ukrainian forces about the planned attacks by two groups of assassins from Chechnya.

Response 
During an interview with CBS, US Secretary of State Antony Blinken announced that the Ukrainian government had prepared for the potential death of Zelenskyy in the invasion, but would not disclose additional details.

See also 
 2022 Ukrainian coup d'état attempt
 Suspicious deaths of Russian businesspeople (2022–2023)

References

Events affected by the 2022 Russian invasion of Ukraine
Zelenskyy
State-sponsored terrorism
Volodymyr Zelenskyy
Wagner Group